The YMP file (file-extension .ymp) which stands for YaST Meta Package, is a file used in the openSUSE operating system (based on the Linux kernel). It is used in a feature called one-click install. This allows a user to click a "One-Click Install" button on certain websites to automatically install software, without having to download and install the software separately. The YMP file will open the one-click install manager which is managed by YaST. The system will automatically add the repository containing the application, and then download and install the program.
The file contains XML content of where to find the package and other such details.

Installation software
SUSE Linux
XML software